Kiên Lương is township and capital of Kiên Lương District, Kiên Giang Province in the Mekong Delta region of Vietnam. As of 2003, the town had a population of 24,287. The town covers an area of 35 km².

The town is 27 km southeast of Hà Tiên and 62 km northwest of Rạch Giá.

References

Populated places in Kiên Giang province
District capitals in Vietnam
Townships in Vietnam